The Sound of Fury (reissued as Try and Get Me!) is a 1950 American crime film noir directed by Cy Endfield and starring Frank Lovejoy, Kathleen Ryan, Richard Carlson. The film is based on the 1947 novel The Condemned by Jo Pagano, who also wrote the screenplay.

The Pagano novel was based on events that occurred in 1933 when two men were arrested in San Jose, California for the kidnapping and murder of Brooke Hart. The suspects confessed and were subsequently lynched by a mob of locals. The 1936 film Fury, directed by Fritz Lang, was inspired by the same incident.

Plot
Howard Tyler is a family man from Boston, living in California with his wife and boy, who has trouble finding a job. He meets charismatic small-time hood Jerry Slocum, who hires Howard to participate in gas-station robberies. Later, Jerry concocts a plan to kidnap the son of a wealthy man to receive a large ransom. Things go wrong when Jerry kills the man and throws the body into a lake. Howard, who did not know that his and Jerry's criminal exploits would include murder, reaches his emotional limit and begins drinking heavily. He meets a lonely woman and, while drunk, confesses to the crime. The woman flees and informs the police.

When the two kidnappers are arrested, a local journalist writes a series of vicious articles about the two prisoners. A vicious mob assembles outside the police station, overpowers the guards and storms the building, seizing the two men in order to kill them.

Cast
 Frank Lovejoy as Howard Tyler
 Kathleen Ryan as Judy Tyler
 Richard Carlson as Gil Stanton
 Lloyd Bridges as Jerry Slocum
 Katherine Locke as Hazel Weatherwax
 Adele Jergens as Velma
 Art Smith as Hal Clendenning
 Renzo Cesana as Dr. Vido Simone
 Irene Vernon as Helen Stanton
 Cliff Clark as Sheriff Lem Deming
 Harry Shannon as Mr. Yaeger
 Donald Doss as Tommy Tyler (as Donald Smelick)

Reception

Critical response
New York Times film critic Bosley Crowther panned the film, writing: "Although Mr. Endfield has directed the violent climactic scenes with a great deal of sharp visualization of mass hysteria and heat, conveying a grim impression of the nastiness of a mob, he has filmed the rest of the picture in a conventional melodramatic style. Neither the script nor the numerous performances are of a distinctive quality."

Raymond Borde and Etienne Chaumeton, in a work on American film noir, wrote that "the prison assault remains one of the most brutal sequences in postwar American cinema."

In 1998, Jonathan Rosenbaum of the Chicago Reader included the film in his unranked list of the best American films not included on the AFI Top 100.

Accolades
Nominations
 British Academy of Film and Television Arts Awards: Best Film from Any Source, 1952.

Restoration 
Among the final films made in the U.S. by blacklisted writer/director Cy Endfield before he relocated to England, The Sound of Fury has been restored by the Film Noir Foundation. The restored version was aired for the first time on Turner Classic Movies on January 25, 2020, and was introduced by Eddie Muller.

References

External links
 
 
 
 The Sound of Fury at Film Noir of the Week by Glenn Erickson

1950 films
1950 crime drama films
American black-and-white films
American crime drama films
Film noir
Films about kidnapping
Films based on American novels
Films directed by Cy Endfield
Films scored by Hugo Friedhofer
Films set in California
United Artists films
1950s English-language films
1950s American films